The Xudabao Nuclear Power Plant, known also as Xudapu, is a nuclear power station under construction in Xudabao Village, Haibin County, Xingcheng, Huludao, on the coast of Liaoning Province, in northeast China.  
It was initially planned to have six 1000-MW AP1000 or CAP1000 light water reactors, but currently only the first two are still planned and the further 2 units will be VVER-1200s.

China National Nuclear Corporation (CNNC) owns 70% of the project, along with Datang International Power Generation Co. (20%), and State Development and Investment Corporation (10%).
China Nuclear Power Engineering Company (CNPEC) is the general contractor for the project; in 2016 the initial version with 6 AP1000 was expected to cost some CNY 110 billion ($17.1 billion).

Preliminary work on the site began in 2010, but no nuclear concrete pour was made, and works were suspended for several years after the 2011 Fukushima Daiichi nuclear disaster.
In 2014, the National Nuclear Safety Administration (NNSA) granted approval for the first two units.
In 2016, China Nuclear Industry 22 Construction Company (CNI22), a subsidiary of China Nuclear Engineering and Construction Corporation (CNECC) signed an EPC contract for the first two units.

China National Nuclear Corporation (CNNC) and Atomstroyexport signed the detailed contract for the construction of two VVER-1200s (Xudabao 3 and 4) on 7 March 2019. Commercial operation of both units is expected in 2028.

First concrete pour started on 28 July 2021, with unit 3, which despite its designation is the first reactor at the site. Work on unit 4 began in May 2022. Rosatom will supply the nuclear island; the turbine generators will be supplied by China .

Reactor data
The Xudabao Nuclear Power Plant consist of 2 planned reactors, and 2 reactors currently under construction.

See also

Nuclear power in China

References

Nuclear power stations using AP1000 reactors
Nuclear power stations in China
Power stations in Zhejiang
Buildings and structures under construction in China
Nuclear power stations with proposed reactors